Marco Solfrini (30 January 1958 – 24 March 2018) was an Italian basketball player who won the silver medal with his national team at the 1980 Summer Olympics in Moscow. He ended his career in 1994 at a club in Siena. He played as a forward.

References

External links
 

1958 births
2018 deaths
Basketball players at the 1980 Summer Olympics
Fabriano Basket players
Italian men's basketball players
Medalists at the 1980 Summer Olympics
Mens Sana Basket players
Olympic basketball players of Italy
Olympic silver medalists for Italy
Olympic medalists in basketball
Solfrini, Marco
Sportspeople from Brescia
Small forwards